Erik Walter Gandini (born 14 August 1967) is an Italian-Swedish film director, writer, and producer and professor of documentary film at Stockholm University of the Arts.

His film The Swedish Theory of Love premiered at the 2015 Stockholm International Film Festival.

Early life
Erik Gandini moved to Sweden aged 19 to attend film school and avoid military service in Italy. After his studies at Biskops Arnö and having completed a master's degree in film science at Stockholm University, he started working as a documentary filmmaker.

In 1994, Gandini adventured with a fake letter of recommendation from a small local Swedish TV broadcaster to the besieged city of Sarajevo where he directed and produced his first documentary Raja Sarajevo for Sveriges Television. The film, shot on a small Hi-8 camera by cinematographer Martina Iverus, followed four young friends trying to survive the brutality of the siege. Raja Sarajevo was Gandini's international breakthrough and was presented at Berlin International Film Festival, at IDFA, Cinema du Reél in Paris.

In 2000, Erik Gandini founded the Stockholm-based film production company ATMO, together with Tarik Saleh, Lars Rodvald and Kristina Åberg. In 2013 Gandini moved to Fasad, working alongside Jesper Kurlandsky, Jesper Ganslandt and Juan Libossart.

Documentaries

Raja Sarajevo
Raja Sarajevo from 1994 (Raja means 'group of friends' in Bosnian) starred i.a. Enes Zlatar, leader of rock band Sikter and international artist Nebojsa Seric Soba, who at the time was a part-time art student and part-time soldier in the Bosnian army. In 1996, Erik Gandini shot a second documentary about the Balkan War, Not without Prijedor, about four young Bosnian refugees in Sweden who decided to return to their country to join the war. The same year he became part of a cult TV show on Swedish TV, ELBYL, where he met with Tarik Saleh.

His film Amerasians-the 100.000 children of the vietnam war from 1998 about the children of American soldiers and Vietnamese women was awarded the Silver Spire at the 1999 San Francisco International Film Festival

Sacrificio - Who Betrayed Che Guevara?
In 2001, he co-directed with Tarik Saleh the documentary film Sacrificio - Who Betrayed Che Guevara?. The film centers around Ciro Bustos, Che Guevara's Argentinian lieutenant and the person who more than other has been blamed in history books as guilty of Che's death.

When captured in Bolivia, Bustos drew Ches portraits of Che Guevara and his guerrillas for the Bolivian army. Providing his interrogators with drawings framed Bustos as a traitor by historians but was according to his version part of a misleading strategy adopted under interrogation. After living in Sweden in silence for some thirty years, Sacrificio was the first documentary he took part in.

Sacrificio confronts Busto's version of the events with the surviving protagonists of Che Guevara's death and raises questions about how history has been written. Sacrificio stars several of the main characters surrounding the capture and killing of the Argentinian revolutionary leader, including former CIA agent Felix Rodriguez, former Bolivian General Gary Prado and Che Guevara's executioner Mario Teran.

When released in 2001, Sacrificio sparked an international debate concerning Che's death and shed new light on the role played by French intellectual Régis Debray.

Creative documentary

Surplus - Terrorized into Being Consumers
Surplus: Terrorized into Being Consumers from 2003 is a film odyssey about the destructive sides of consumer culture, shot in Sweden, USA, China, India, Cuba, Hungary and Italy over a three-year period. Surplus marked the start of a strong co-operation with composer-editor Johan Söderberg. Surplus premiered in competition at the largest documentary film festival IDFA in Amsterdam in 2003 where it won the prestigious Silver Wolf Award.

Surplus'''s innovative style is the product of a method that Gandini adopts in his very personal approach to documentary film, "the freest, cheapest way for a person to express themselves cinematically". Although his films deal with social issues they are far from traditional political documentaries. They are "creative documentaries" relying on the idea of "show, don't tell", to give the viewer an experience of politics rather than mere facts, making a powerful use of cinematography, music and editing to make their point.

GitmoGitmo – The New Rules of War is a documentary about the Guantanamo Bay detention camp by Erik Gandini and Tarik Saleh. The film features interviews with Janis Karpinski, Mehdi Ghezali and Geoffrey Miller, among others. Gitmo premiered at IDFA in 2005, and reached mainstream theaters in Sweden on February 10, 2006. It won a Jury award as best documentary at the 2006 Seattle International Film Festival,

In July 2012, after a suicide bomb attack that left seven people dead in the Bulgarian city of Burgas on a bus carrying Israeli tourists, Gitmo's main character and former Guantanamo detainee Mehdi Ghezali was named in Bulgarian and Israeli media as the main suspect. The Swedish Secret services denied soon after categorically his involvement but his name picture had already been widely exposed in the world press.

Videocracy
Erik Gandini's 2009 feature-length documentary Videocracy is so far his most successful film. The film, produced and directed by Gandini, explores how Italy has been pushed to the brink of moral melt-down under the rule of Silvio Berlusconi. When it premiered at the Venice International Film Festival, its trailer was banned by Italian state broadcaster RAI, stirring an international controversy. When widely released in theaters across Italy, it climbed to the fourth position on the Italian Box Office the first weekend.Videocracy was voted best documentary film at the Toronto International Film Festival by a critics poll conducted by Indy Wire and chosen as one of the best documentaries in 2010 by The Guardian top critic Peter Bradshaw.

"The Evilness of Banality"
To explain the cultural phenomenon of Berlusconismo, Erik Gandini coined the expression "The Evilness of Banality", thus paraphrasing Hannah Arendt's banality of evil.

In 2010, Erik Gandini was appointed visiting professor at Karlstad University, Global Media Studies. Besides his professional career as a director and producer, Gandini lectures extensively about film, politics and media, in Sweden, Italy and around the world.

 The Swedish Theory of Love 
The documentary The Swedish Theory of Love is Gandini's social critique on the ideology of individual independence of Swedish society. The film suggests that the Swedes are suffering from an epidemic of loneliness. Gandini was inspired by his own 'split-life' as an Italian Swede. The title of the movie is derived from the book Is the Swede a Human Being?'', written by the Swedish historians Henrik Berggren och Lars Trägårdh.

The movie premiered in internationally in competition at CPH DO and IDFA in the Master section, nominated for Best Documentary at the Stockholm Film Festival in 2015 and was released theatrically in Italy, Spain, Poland, Norway and The Netherlands. It has stirred wide debate loneliness in times of self determination and existential modern life.

Recognitions
Erik Gandini is the winner of the 2012 Maj Zetterling award. The prize of 200,000SEK was granted by the Swedish Art Council for his 'innovation of cinematic language within the documentary genre' Gandini was also nominated Swedish producer of the year in 2010, competing for the Lorens Award

As producer

The Raft 
As a producer Gandini has been involved in a number of docs at ATMO and FASAD. Among others The Raft by director Marcus Lindéen winner of the main competition at CPH DOX in 2018 and also Prix Europa in 2019.

Professor of Documentary Film

The Future Through The Present and the film After Work 
Since 2016 Gandini is professor of Documentary Film at Stockholm University of the Arts where he teaches Creative Documentary. In parallel with it he is leading a research project about the future of work The Future Through the Present, in collaboration with sociologist Roland Paulsen and film professor/director Jyoti Mistry. This interdisciplinary collaboration within an artistic research project is also a documentary film that explores through real stories from four continents, captured by innovative film methods, a new work ethic compatibile with the future. The research project has been granted funding by The Swedish Research Council, Vetenskapsrådet and After Work is the title of a feature length documentary connected to it, directed by Gandini and produced by Jesper Kurlandsky for FASAD.

Personal life
Gandini lives in Sweden and Italy and has three children.

Awards

References

External links
 ATMO
 

1967 births
Living people
Film people from Bergamo
Italian film directors
Swedish film directors
Italian emigrants to Sweden